"Human" is a song by Swedish singer Oscar Zia. It was released on 28 February 2016 as a digital download in Sweden. The song was written and composed by Oscar Zia along with Victor Thell and Maria Smith. It placed second in the final of Melodifestivalen 2016.

Melodifestivalen
Being Zia's third participation in the Swedish Eurovision selection, "Human" participated in the third semi-final of the 2016
Melodifestivalen which was held in Norrköping's Himmelstalundshallen on 20 February 2016. The song was performed last at the semi-final. It direct qualified to the final as it got one of the first two places. On 12 March, during the final at the Friends Arena in Stockholm, Zia performed the performed the song at the fifth position of the running order and got the highest score from the 11 international juries. Overall "Human" placed second in the competition with 132 points.

Track listing

Charts

Release history

References

External links

Melodifestivalen songs of 2019
Oscar Zia songs
2019 singles
2019 songs
Parlophone singles